George Mahoney (born January 15, 1865) was a fireman first class serving in the United States Navy during the Spanish–American War who received the Medal of Honor for bravery.

Biography
Mahoney was born January 15, 1865, in Worcester, Massachusetts and after entering the navy was sent fireman first class.

Medal of Honor citation
Rank and organization: Fireman First Class, U.S. Navy. Born: 15 January 1865, Worcester, Mass. Accredited to: Pennsylvania. G.O. No.: 167, 27 August 1904.

Citation:

On board the U.S.S. Vixen on the night of 28 May 1898. Following the explosion of the lower front manhole gasket of boiler A of that vessel, Mahoney displayed great coolness and self-possession in entering the fireroom.

See also

List of Medal of Honor recipients for the Spanish–American War

References

External links

1865 births
Year of death missing
United States Navy Medal of Honor recipients
United States Navy sailors
American military personnel of the Spanish–American War
People from Worcester, Massachusetts
Spanish–American War recipients of the Medal of Honor